Future's Gone Tomorrow / Life Is Here Today is the fourth album by Swedish pop singer Bosson. It was released in 2007 by SEO Music and Bonnier Amigo. It peaked in Sweden at #21 on the Swedish Album Charts.

Background
The album is typically Bosson-styled, with his characteristic high pitched vocals.

Singles
Out of the four singles released, only "What If I" managed to enter the Swedish Charts, peaking at #39. The album also features "Live Forever", a Magnus Carlsson cover which competed within Melodifestivalen 2007.

Track listing

References

2007 albums
Bosson albums